Nouri Zorgati (25 August 1937 – 12 October 2014) was a Tunisian politician.

Career
Born in Sousse on 25 August 1937, Zorgati began his political career working for the Ministry of Regional Development from 1968 to 1987. He was first appointed Minister of Finance on 27 October 1987. On 11 April 1989, Zorgati became agriculture minister. He stepped down to serve as the leader of the Union of Tunisian Banks, in Paris, from May 1991 to June 1992. On 9 June 1992, Zorgati began his second stint as finance minister before returning to the Union of Tunisian Banks between 22 January 1997 and 2 August 2002. He died on 12 October 2014, aged 77, at a hospital in France.

References

1937 births
2014 deaths
Socialist Destourian Party politicians
People from Sousse
Finance ministers of Tunisia
Government ministers of Tunisia
Democratic Constitutional Rally politicians